Abel Guidet (6 November 1890 – 27 November 1944) was a French politician. A decorated veteran of World War I, he served as a member of the Chamber of Deputies from 1936 to 1942, representing Pas-de-Calais. He was arrested by the Nazis during World War II, and he died in the Gross-Rosen concentration camp.

Early life
Abel Guidet was born on 6 November 1980 in Bapaume, Pas-de-Calais, France. He served in the French Army during World War II. He was awarded the Croix de Guerre, the Médaille militaire, Military Medal and the knighthood of the Legion of Honour for his service.

Career
Guidet became the mayor of his hometown of Bapaume in 1929. He served as a member of the Chamber of Deputies from 1936 to 1942, representing Pas-de-Calais.

Arrest, death and legacy
Guidet was arrested by the Nazis on 27 November 1943, and he died in the Gross-Rosen concentration camp. He is the namesake of the square Abel-Guidet in Bapaume. On 27 November 2014, the city of Bapaume organized a commemorative event in his honour.

References

1890 births
1944 deaths
People from Pas-de-Calais
Radical Party (France) politicians
Members of the 16th Chamber of Deputies of the French Third Republic
Mayors of places in Hauts-de-France
French military personnel of World War I
French Resistance members
Recipients of the Croix de Guerre 1914–1918 (France)
Recipients of the Military Medal
Chevaliers of the Légion d'honneur
People who died in Gross-Rosen concentration camp